The Thin Line is the ninth international co-production of MediaCorp TV and ntv7. This is also the first Malaysian TV series to be broadcast on MediaCorp Channel U when it debuted on 29 December 2010.

The actual filming took place in August 2008 and the series was aired on ntv7 in Malaysia the following month.

Cast

Chen family

Other cast

Synopsis
Liang Yaoguo and his younger sister Zhiling had a hard life growing up with a loving but socially irresponsible mother and without a father. Yaoguo is responsible and diligent and cares for his family and friends. He and Zhiling are well-liked by everyone.

Chen Youshun runs Youshun Hang, wholesale food business, and has three children. His first wife left him when Tianbao was a boy and Tianbao dropped out of school early to help his father with the business. Youshun later remarried Xianglan, a trendy and arrogant younger woman who bore him a son and a daughter, Tianyou and Tianhui. While Tianbao dotes on his younger siblings and the threesome have a good relationship, he and Xianglan do not get along due to her favouritism towards Tianyou and Tianhui, leaving the exasperated Youshun sandwiched between them. Eventually Xianglan's elitist attitude drives a wedge between herself and Tianyou and her husband and makes enemies of their neighbours.

Tianbao, Tianyou and Tianhui have been best friends with Yaoguo and Zhiling since childhood. Tianyou and Zhiling are an item. Yaoguo meets Lin Meiqi, Tianhui's college classmate, and they fall in love. A handsome young man named Huang Junjie starts wooing Tianhui. Tianbao eventually finds the love of his life.

Just when everyone thought life could not get any better, fate throws them a curve ball. It turns out that Junjie wanted to take revenge on the older Mr Chen for a past incident. However, Junjie becomes torn when he realises he is in love with Tianhui. Yaoguo and Tianyou's friendship is tested when Tianyou starts courting Meiqi for some reason. Junjie, Yaoguo and Tianyou realise that there is a thin line between good and evil and a single decision could change their lives for better or worse.

Awards and nominations
Golden Awards
 Nominated: Best Actor (Wee Kheng Ming)
 Nominated: Best Actor (Zen Chong)
 Nominated: Best Supporting Actress (Jane Ng)
 Nominated: Best Supporting Actress (Stella Chung)
 Nominated: Best Newcomer (Tracy Lee)

References

External links
 

Chinese-language drama television series in Malaysia
Singapore Chinese dramas
Singapore–Malaysia television co-productions
2008 Malaysian television series debuts
2008 Malaysian television series endings
2008 Singaporean television series debuts
2008 Singaporean television series endings
NTV7 original programming
Channel U (Singapore) original programming